Edmond Wyche Jr. (June 15, 1933 – February 16, 2016) was an American football coach. He served as the head football coach at Howard University (1973), Delaware State University (1975–1978), Hampton University (1981–1983), Alabama A&M University (1984–1985), and Morgan State University (1988–1990), compiling a career college football coaching record of 61–71–5. Wyche played football at Union Academy High School in Bartow, Florida and Florida A&M University. He earned a master's degree from Howard.

Head coaching record

College

References

External links
 

1933 births
2016 deaths
American football centers
Alabama A&M Bulldogs football coaches
Cheyney Wolves football coaches
Delaware State Hornets football coaches
Florida A&M Rattlers football players
Fort Valley State Wildcats athletic directors
Hampton Pirates football coaches
Howard Bison football coaches
Morgan State Bears football coaches
Seattle Seahawks scouts
High school football coaches in Florida
Howard University alumni
People from Bartow, Florida
Coaches of American football from Florida
Players of American football from Florida
African-American coaches of American football
African-American college athletic directors in the United States
African-American players of American football
20th-century African-American sportspeople
21st-century African-American sportspeople